With Davy Crockett at the Fall of the Alamo is a 1926 American silent Western film directed by Robert N. Bradbury and starring Cullen Landis, Kathryn McGuire, and Edward Hearn.The Battle scenes of the silent film would be reused for the 1937 movie Heroes of the Alamo

Cast

References

External links 
 
 

1926 films
1926 Western (genre) films
Films directed by Robert N. Bradbury
1920s English-language films
Films set in Texas
Films set in the 1830s
1920s historical films
American historical films
Texas Revolution films
Cultural depictions of Davy Crockett
Silent American Western (genre) films
1920s American films
Cultural depictions of James Bowie